Arthur W. Murphy is Professor Emeritus of Law at Columbia University, who has written on many aspects of nuclear power.  From 1961-73 he was a member of the Atomic Safety and Licensing Board of the U.S. Atomic Energy Commission. In 1976 he wrote the book The Nuclear Power Controversy.

See also
List of books about nuclear issues

References

People associated with nuclear power
Living people
Year of birth missing (living people)
Place of birth missing (living people)
Columbia University faculty